Jonas Föhrenbach (born 26 January 1996) is a German professional footballer who plays as a centre-back for 1. FC Heidenheim.

Club career
Föhrenbach made his first-team debut on 22 August 2015, playing the full 90 minutes in Freiburg's 2–1 win over Fortuna Düsseldorf on matchday 4 of the 2015–16 2. Bundesliga season.

In June 2017, Föhrenbach joined 3. Liga side Karlsruher SC on loan for the 2017–18 season. A year later, he again left Freiburg on loan, joining 2. Bundesliga club SSV Jahn Regensburg for the 2018–19 season. When his loan ended in 2019, he transferred to 1. FC Heidenheim.

International career
Föhrenbach is a youth international footballer for Germany.

Honours
Individual
 Fritz Walter Medal U18 Bronze: 2014

References

External links
 
 

1996 births
Living people
German footballers
Footballers from Baden-Württemberg
Association football defenders
Germany youth international footballers
Sportspeople from Freiburg im Breisgau
Bundesliga players
2. Bundesliga players
3. Liga players
SC Freiburg players
Karlsruher SC players
SSV Jahn Regensburg players
1. FC Heidenheim players